() is a minor German political party founded in November 2022. It is led by Steffen Große, the former leader of the Free Voters of Saxony and a former Christian Democratic Union member. The party has a total of 50 members, some former members of the conservative Christian Democratic Union and Christian Social Union, of the right-wing populist Alternative for Germany, market-liberal Free Liberals, and of the Social Democratic Party. It describes itself as politically between the Christian Democrats and the Alternative for Germany.  announced plans to run in the May 2023 state-level elections in Bremen. In January 2023 the Member of the European Parliament Lars Patrick Berg left the Liberal Conservative Reformers party and joined Bündnis Deutschland.

See also 

 Conservatism in Germany
 List of political parties in Germany

References 

Political parties established in 2022
Conservative parties in Germany